Cebularz is a wheat dough pancake in Polish and Ashkenazi Jewish cuisine, with a diameter of 15-20 cm, topped with diced onion and poppy seed (15-20%), characteristic for Lublin cuisine.

Cebularz is one of the most popular dishes in the Lublin area. The recipe for the pancake was passed down the generations, with written records since the nineteenth-century. The first to bake the pancake were Jews, selling their produce in Lublin Old Town. Before World War II they were already widely popular in Lublin Voivodeship.  

In 2007, cebularz was registered on the Polish Ministry of Agriculture and Rural Development's List of Traditional Products. In August 2014, cebularz pancakes have been placed on the European Union's Geographical Indications and Traditional Specialities list.

See also
Lublin cuisine
Pletzel

External links
Guilty Pleasures: Regional Fast Foods from Poland

References

Ashkenazi Jewish cuisine
Jews and Judaism in Lublin
Polish cuisine
Polish pastries